The Slideshow Effect is the first full-length album by the Guelph, Ontario-based band Memoryhouse, and their second release on US label Sub Pop. It was released on February 28, 2012.

Track listing

References

External links
Memoryhouse on Sub Pop

2012 albums
Sub Pop albums
Memoryhouse albums